Gogia is a Georgian surname. Notable people with the surname include:
Akaki Gogia (born 1992), Georgian footballer
Mukhran Gogia (born 1971), retired male weightlifter from Georgia
Tamaz Gogia (born 1961), Abkhazian politician

Surnames of Georgian origin
Georgian-language surnames
Surnames of Abkhazian origin